West Bengal Transport Corporation (WBTC) is a West Bengal state government undertaken corporation. It plies buses, trams and ferries in the state. It was formed by merging existing state transport agencies, namely the Calcutta State Transport Corporation, the Calcutta Tramways Company and the West Bengal Surface Transport Corporation.

History

Bus services in Kolkata started in the year 1920 but were unorganised. The organized road transport in the public sector was given shape on 31 July 1948 with the creation of State Transport Services under the Directorate of Transportation, Government of West Bengal. It started operations on 6 intracity routes, with a fleet of 25 buses. Diesel era started with the addition of 2 (two) Double Decker buses in 1949–50. Then the STS became self-sustainable with the establishment of depots and terminals. Gradually the structure of State Transport Services turned into a full-fledged organization with spreading its network of operation throughout the entire city (mainly covering Calcutta Improvement Trust area). After about 12 years, State Transport Services became CSTC (Calcutta State Transport Corporation) on 15 June 1960. This was the start of a new era for the public transport system in the city and state. Up to 1966-67 CSTC nationalized about 90% of the City routes. After that CSTC could not sustain the increased passenger demands in the city mainly  due to the financial constraints. Since then the Government decided to allow private buses to operate in CSTC routes and areas. It also started operating on long-distance routes, starting with CalcuttaDigha in 1968. Over the years, with rapid expansions of long-distance operations, CSTC connected remote rural areas of the state with Kolkata. Soon, it covered almost the whole state and connected the district headquarter towns. In the year 1989, a new body was formed, named West Bengal Inland Water Transport Corporation Limited, for the operation of Vessel services. It started with the Ferry Service on the Hoogly and the Muriganga rivers. Later this was merged into West Bengal State Transport Corporation, which provided bus services in Kolkata and different areas of South 24-Parganas, along with the CSTC. In June 2016, WBSTC, CTC and CSTC were merged into one with operational name WBTC. Till the merge, WBSTC had  a fleet of 233 (Volvo AC, TATA Marcopolo AC and Non-AC) buses.

Operations

Fleet
WBTC has a fleet of 1337 buses as of 2019. and 20 vessels for Passenger Ferry Service. Right now its fleet consists of 400 AC buses.

Division
Previously, the depots were separately administered by CSTC, CTC, WBSTC, SBSTC, NBSTC. But after the merger, all have come under the purview of WBTC.

Services

Bus services 

Buses are operated on many routes across Kolkata and West Bengal.

Night services
This was introduced to provide 24x7 transportation service to the city. These planned routes will closely knit Govt and Private Hospitals, Blood Banks, major Nursing Homes, Burning Ghats, Burial Grounds where stranded passengers will easily avail these services. Beside that other routes will also connect north–south part of the city, Salt Lake, New Town, Sealdah Station, Howrah Station and Dum Dum Airport as well.

Both buses and trams ply at night, and the numbers start with NS.

Banglasree Express AC Bus services
 
This service was introduced to connect district Headquarters towns of the state with the state capital with express bus service, so that people can travel overnight to reach Kolkata. Some routes are privatized and not operated by WBTC.

The bus numbers start with BE.

Tram services

The tram operations came under WBTC from CTC, after the merge. In 2019 air-conditioned buses were introduced in the network.

Ferry services
WBTC also operates ferry routes across Hooghly river. One can avail the services using daily tickets, and few routes using season ticket.

Special services
Some special transportation services are also provided on some occasions.

 Gangasagar Mela
 Durga Puja Parikrama 
 Durga Puja Shopping Bus Service
 International Kolkata Book Fair Bus Service
 Winter Weekend Special
 Eco Park Operation
 Christmas Carnival
 Haj Operation

Other utilities

Pathadisha app
This application is for commuters of Kolkata metropolitan area. By this application, commuters can view all incoming or outgoing buses and some for a particular stop or current location. One can also plan a trip in the app. This doesn't include the Tram services.

Intelligent Transport System
To cope up with the increasing demand of public transport in the city, some innovative measures were taken up, with a cost of ₹ 9,39,89,926, except fleet management. This also includes the Pathadisha app.

 On-Bus Intelligent Transport System (OBITS)
 Automatic Fare collection system (AFCS) with Smart Card ticketing system (West Bengal Transport Card)
 Passenger Information system including Mobile Application on the basis of Vehicle Tracking System
 Fleet Management System
 Integration Services for UBS-II complied Buses
 Passenger friendly on-board destination display
 Removal of additional switch for ITS to enable tracking whenever the ignition is on
 Zero cost on commuter to use these facilities – info available on their smart phones and publicly displayed LEDs
 A unique application (Driver's app) has been introduced to track non-BS-IV vehicles too

Public initiatives
Kolkata Tram Library: WBTC launched India's first Tram library on 24 September 2020, in presence of MD, WBTC, Rajanvir Singh Kapur IAS
Kolkata Heritage River Cruise: launched by WBTC on 1 October 2020. Present were Transport Secretary, Chairman WBTC, MD WBTC. 
Kolkata Tyre Park: launched on 13 November 2020, made using scrap tyres in presence of Chairman Rachpal Singh, Vice Chairman Saha and MD Rajanvir Singh Kapur IAS.
Paat Rani: A tram with jute items made by inmates of Presidency and Dum Dum Correctional Homes was launched on 13 November 2020.
On 14 November 2020, WBTC launched world's first children library named Kolkata Young Readers’ Tramcar. Launched by MD WBTC Rajanvir Singh Kapur and Director Apeejay, Priti Paul.
 Road Safety Campaign called Safe Drive Save Life
 Environment Protection campaign through the Green Movement campaign
On the 140th Anniversary of registration of the Calcutta Tramways Company in London, on 22 December 2020; WBTC launched Tram World Kolkata ( TWK). TWK was planned to convert a junkyard in Gariahat Tram depot. The entire effort took 41 days.
In 41 days the area was converted into a paradise for tram lovers, with stamps, tickets, coins, old tram documents and vintage photos. Food, music and art will be added in due course to make it an international tourist destination for tram lovers.

Launched by MD Rajanvir Singh Kapur IAS in presence of Chairman Rachpal Singh IPS Retd.

See also 

 Transport in Kolkata
 Trams in Kolkata
 Calcutta State Transport Corporation
 Calcutta Tramways Company

References 

State road transport corporations of India
Transport in West Bengal
Trams in Kolkata
Companies based in Kolkata
Transport in Kolkata
Transport companies established in 1989
Indian companies established in 1989
1989 establishments in West Bengal